Harold Long may refer to:

Harold G. Long (1930–1998), American martial artist
Harold Long (1941–2013), Canadian politician
Harold Long (cricketer)